is a Japanese moe character created in 2010 which originated from the Breaking News (VIP) Board on 2channel, and has since become an internet meme within various forums and imageboards in Japan. The character is a moe anthropomorphism of the phrase "日本鬼子", a commonly used Chinese ethnic slur against persons of Japanese descent.

Backgrounds
The character was originally conceived by users on a 2ch board as a satire of the aforementioned Chinese racial term. In China, the term Riben guizi "日本鬼子" is a phrase used since World War II, and still used today, as a disparaging epithet against the Japanese. Japanese netizens chose to transform the normally racist and offensive phrase into a character which could be depicted as "cute" or moe, in an expression that the negative connotations behind the slur can be reversed. The creation of the character in 2010 follows the escalation of the Senkaku Islands dispute as a result of the fishing trawler collision incident which occurred not too long before, and was intended as a "hit back" response against growing anti-Japanese sentiment amongst Chinese netizens online and within the public opinion of Chinese people in general following the island dispute incident.

Etymology
In Japanese, the slur 日本鬼子 is generally read as rīben guizu (リーベングイズ), a direct transliteration of the Mandarin rìběn guǐzi. However, the characters can be alternately read using kun'yomi and nanori readings as Hinomoto Oniko, which in Japanese resembles a female name. Within the Kun'yomi reading, the character's "surname" Hi no moto can have the literal meaning "origin of the sun", whilst Japanese given names ending in 子 (-ko) are considered feminine, and are generally used as girls' names (for example, 山田花子 Yamada Hanako is a placeholder female name).

Characteristics
The main design motif is based on the Oni in Japanese folklore. Since the character was designed to be a "personification" of the slur, she is portrayed as a young woman with long black hair and pale skin, often wearing a kimono and demon horns, whilst holding various motifs unique to Japanese culture, such as a naginata and a hannya mask. A variant of the character is known as "little Oniko" (Ko-hinomoto or Konipon) (derived from another Chinese slur, Xiao riben "小日本" ), who is depicted as a pre-pubescent girl of similar appearance to the original Oniko, and also carries Japanese culture-related motifs along with her.

See also
ISIS-chan

References

External links
hinomotooniko＠ウィキ
鬼子プロジェクト (oniko_project) on Twitter
28 October 2010, Japan Fights China with Moe, China Crushed, Sankakucomplex
1 November 2010, [NIHON ONOKO] Classic Japanese Idol [English Subtitles], YouTube
2 November 2010, Japanese Netizens turn Chinese derogatory term into beautiful young girl anime character, ChinaHush
(万物皆可萌)日本鬼子萌化中---2CH萌娘日本鬼子
日本鬼子萌化中

2channel
Anti-Asian slurs
Internet memes
Moe anthropomorphism
Anti-Japanese sentiment in China